Berg Palace is a manor house situated on the east bank of Lake Starnberg in the village of Berg in Upper Bavaria, Germany. The site became widely known as the last residence of King Ludwig II of Bavaria and location of his disputed death. Today, it serves as residence of Franz, Duke of Bavaria, head of the house of Wittelsbach.

History 

Ferdinand Maria, Elector of Bavaria, acquired a piece of land on the banks of Lake Starnberg in 1676 from the Horwarth family and ordered the construction of Berg Palace. Ferdinand used it for festivities, but it reached its zenith under his successors, elector Max Emanuel and Emperor Charles VII, when it served as the ambiance for spectacular entertainment and hunting events.

Between 1849 and 1851 King Maximilian II instructed the architect Eduard Riedel to redesign the site in Neo-Gothic style, with added crenellations and four towers, for which the king bought additional land. Maximilian's son Ludwig II of Bavaria had a fifth tower constructed, which he called Isolde. In 1853 Maximilian had a small private harbour built.

Ludwig II used the site as his summer residence, moving here regularly every year on 11 May. For this purpose he established a telegraph line from Berg to the capital Munich.

In 1868 the Czarina of Russia Maria Alexandrovna visited Berg upon the King's invitation. Ludwig made it her residence for the duration of her visit and had it magnificently decorated for the occasion, as the site was otherwise rather modestly appointed by Ludwig's standards.

The surrounding park was fashioned and cultivated by his predecessors according to contemporary ideas of garden design, from a formal Baroque garden to an English landscape garden. Ludwig had the "Moorish Kiosk" set up here which Franz von Seitz had designed and built for the Winter Garden on the roof of the Munich Residenz.

In 1876 the King had a small chapel built.

On 12 June 1886, Ludwig, after he had just been declared mentally impaired and incapable of ruling and his uncle Luitpold having been appointed regent, was transferred to Berg Palace. On June 13 he and his physician Bernhard von Gudden were found dead in the shallow waters at the banks of Lake Starnberg. The deaths remain contested, despite the official statement of drowning. A votive chapel and a memorial cross in the lake's shallows mark the site since.

After the king's death the house, still owned by the royal family, became a museum and in 1939 was declared a monument, as it had not been changed since Ludwig's death, and thus acquired not only a historical but also a cultural significance.

After World War II, the site was occupied by American soldiers, who damaged it severely, compounding previous damage caused by the war, especially to the corner towers, and further damage was caused due to burst water pipes. Little of the original furniture was preserved. It was completely renovated from 1949 to 1951, as the corner towers were entirely removed and the building was restored to its condition before Maximilian's intervention, although the chapel was not removed. Subsequently Albrecht, Duke of Bavaria, moved in and used it as his main residence until his death in 1996, upon which his eldest son Franz followed him as head of the House of Wittelsbach. However, Franz decided to officially live in Munich instead, where he occupies a wing of the Nymphenburg Palace and uses Berg Palace as his country retreat.

Notes and references

Sources
 History of Schloss Berg 
 Modern photographs of Schloss Berg

Royal residences in Bavaria
Palaces in Bavaria
Buildings and structures in Starnberg (district)
Gothic Revival architecture in Germany